Vida is the usual term for a brief prose biography, written in Old Occitan, of a troubadour or trobairitz.

The word vida means "life" in Occitan languages; they are short prose biographies of the troubadours, and they are found in some chansonniers, along with the works of the author they describe. Vidas are notoriously unreliable: Mouzat, while complaining that some scholars still believe them, says they represent the authors as "ridiculous bohemians, and picaresque heroes"; Alfred Jeanroy calls them "the ancestors of modern novels". Most often, they are not based on independent sources, and their information is deduced from literal readings of details of the poems. Most of the vidas were composed in Italy, many by Uc de Saint Circ.

Additionally, some individual poems are accompanied by razos, explanations of the circumstances in which the poem was composed.

Troubadours with vidas

Sources
There is a complete collection of vidas, with French translation and commentary, by Boutière and Schutz.
Biographies des troubadours, edd. and trans. J. Boutière and A.-H. Schutz. Paris: Nizet, 1964.
There is a complete collection of English translations available as part of the Garland Library of Medieval Literature, Series B, translated by Margarita Egan.
The Vidas of the Troubadours, ed. and trans. Margarita Egan. New York: Garland, 1984. .

References 

Occitan literary genres